A solution in radicals or algebraic solution is a closed-form expression, and more specifically a closed-form algebraic expression, that is the solution of a polynomial equation, and relies only on addition, subtraction, multiplication, division, raising to integer powers, and the extraction of th roots (square roots, cube roots, and other integer roots).

A well-known example is the solution 

of the quadratic equation

There exist more complicated algebraic solutions for cubic equations and quartic equations.  The Abel–Ruffini theorem, and, more generally Galois theory, state that some quintic equations, such as 

do not have any algebraic solution. The same is true for every higher degree. However, for any degree there are some polynomial equations that have algebraic solutions; for example, the equation  can be solved as  The eight other solutions are nonreal complex numbers, which are also algebraic and have the form  where  is a fifth root of unity, which can be expressed with two nested square roots. See also  for various other examples in degree 5.

Évariste Galois introduced a criterion allowing one to decide which equations are solvable in radicals. See Radical extension for the precise formulation of his result.

Algebraic solutions form a subset of closed-form expressions, because the latter permit transcendental functions (non-algebraic functions) such as the exponential function, the logarithmic function, and the trigonometric functions and their inverses.

See also
Solvable quintics
Solvable sextics
Solvable septics

References

Algebra
Equations